Hajji Javad (also Romanized as Ḩājjī Javād) is a village in Haparu Rural District, in the Central District of Bagh-e Malek County, Khuzestan Province, Iran. At the 2006 census, its population was 30, in 6 families.

References 

Populated places in Bagh-e Malek County